Inyte

Peter Wurz (born 29 August 1967 in Austria) is an Austrian retired footballer.

References

External links
 What happened to: Peter Wurz
 Peter Wurz: The Plumber Who Could Not Fix The UEFA Drain

1967 births
Living people
Austrian footballers
Association football forwards
SK Rapid Wien players
RCD Espanyol footballers
FC Admira Wacker Mödling players
Austrian expatriate sportspeople in Spain
SC Ostbahn XI players
SC Wiener Neustadt players
Austrian Football Bundesliga players
Austrian expatriate footballers
Expatriate footballers in Spain
La Liga players